Semiramis InterContinental Hotel is a skyscraper and hotel complex located in Garden City, Cairo, Egypt. The 32-story building completed in 1987, and houses an InterContinental hotel. The modernist building replaced the historic Semiramis hotel, and contains 726 rooms and suites, restaurants, bars, a cafe, outdoor Nile view terraces, a Spa, a gym, ballrooms, conference and meeting rooms, a shopping arcade and a casino.

See also
Skyscraper design and construction
List of tallest buildings in Africa

References

1988 establishments in Egypt
Hotels in Cairo
Hotel buildings completed in 1987
Hotels established in 1988